The Pella Community School District, or Pella Schools, is a rural public school district based in Pella, Iowa, and serves the town of Pella and surrounding areas in northeastern Marion and northwestern Mahaska counties, with a small area in southern Jasper County.

Schools
The district operates five schools:
Lincoln Elementary School
Madison Elementary School
Jefferson Intermediate School
Pella Middle School
Pella High School

Pella Schools
The Pella Marching Dutch Band performed in the 2023 Rose Parade in Pasadena, California.

Athletics
The Pella Dutch compete in the Little Hawkeye Conference in the following sports:

Cross Country (boys and girls)
 Boys' (2-time State Champions - 2009, 2011)
Volleyball (girls)
Football (boys)
(892929-time Class 1827838A State Champions - 2014, 2015, 2016)
Basketball (boys and girls)
 Boys' Basketball (3-time Class 3A State Champions - 2002, 2003, 2021)
Bowling
Wrestling 
Swimming (boys and girls)
Track and Field (boys and girls)
 Boys' (2-time Class 3A State Champions - 1983, 2013)
Golf (boys and girls)
 Boys' (4-time State Champions - 1969, 1973, 2001, 2003)
 Girls' 1994 Class 2A State Champions
Tennis (boys and girls)
Soccer (boys and girls)
Baseball (boys)
Softball (girls)

Alumni
Kyle Korver- Former Professional Basketball player for the NBA.

Dave Keuning- Guitar player for the band The Killers

See also
List of school districts in Iowa
List of high schools in Iowa

References

External links
 Pella Community School District

Education in Marion County, Iowa
Education in Mahaska County, Iowa
Education in Jasper County, Iowa
School districts in Iowa